Williamsburg is a census-designated place (CDP) in Orange County, Florida, United States. The population was 7,646 at the 2010 census. It is part of the Orlando–Kissimmee Metropolitan Statistical Area.

Geography
Williamsburg is located at  (28.409817, -81.445917).

According to the United States Census Bureau, the CDP has a total area of 9.7 km (3.8 mi2), of which 9.5 km (3.7 mi2) is land and 0.2 km (0.1 mi2) (1.87%) is water.

Williamsburg is a large subdivision bounded roughly on the north by the Beachline Expressway, on the south by the Central Florida GreeneWay, on the east by Shingle Creek and on the west by International Drive. The main intersection of the community is at Orangewood Blvd. and Central Florida Parkway.

In the early 2000s, Williamsburg's Homeowners Association worked with the Orange County Board of County Commissioners to ensure that traffic from the Orange County Convention Center did not pass through the interchange between Orangewood Boulevard and the Beachline, which would expand to connect to a southern extension of Universal Boulevard. The result was an interchange that directed a bulk of southbound Universal Boulevard traffic onto the Beachline, with only one lane passing under to connect to Orangewood Boulevard.

Demographics

As of the census of 2000, there were 6,736 people, 3,262 households, and 2,035 families residing in the CDP.  The population density was 706.7/km (1,830.4/mi2).  There were 3,492 housing units at an average density of 366.4/km (948.9/mi2).  The racial makeup of the CDP was 89.59% White, 1.97% African American, 0.10% Native American, 3.95% Asian, 0.15% Pacific Islander, 2.15% from other races, and 2.08% from two or more races. Hispanic or Latino of any race were 9.47% of the population.

There were 3,262 households, out of which 13.1% had children under the age of 18 living with them, 52.2% were married couples living together, 7.5% had a female householder with no husband present, and 37.6% were non-families. 28.6% of all households were made up of individuals, and 15.5% had someone living alone who was 65 years of age or older.  The average household size was 2.06 and the average family size was 2.49.

In the CDP, the population was spread out, with 10.7% under the age of 18, 4.4% from 18 to 24, 27.7% from 25 to 44, 24.0% from 45 to 64, and 33.3% who were 65 years of age or older.  The median age was 51 years. For every 100 females, there were 89.7 males.  For every 100 females age 18 and over, there were 88.3 males.

The median income for a household in the CDP was $46,460, and the median income for a family was $51,791. Males had a median income of $37,029 versus $27,337 for females. The per capita income for the CDP was $26,096.  About 2.0% of families and 4.0% of the population were below the poverty line, including 2.9% of those under age 18 and 3.9% of those age 65 or over.

References

Census-designated places in Orange County, Florida
Greater Orlando
Census-designated places in Florida